Jeffrey Robert Thwaites (born 22 November 1992) is a New Zealand rugby union player who currently plays for the Highlanders since 2020 in the Super Rugby competition and for Bay of Plenty in the mitre10 cup competition. Jeff is married to Black fern and Chiefs Manawa player Kelsie Thwaites née Wills.   His position of choice is tighthead prop.

References 

New Zealand rugby union players
1992 births
Living people
Rugby union props
Bay of Plenty rugby union players
Chiefs (rugby union) players
Highlanders (rugby union) players
Kobelco Kobe Steelers players